Phyllonorycter humilitatis is a moth of the family Gracillariidae. It is known from Nepal.

The wingspan is about 5.5 mm.

References

humilitatis
Moths of Asia
Taxa named by Tosio Kumata
Moths described in 1973
Lepidoptera of Nepal